Kurunduwatta Grama Niladhari Division is a Grama Niladhari Division of the Thimbirigasyaya Divisional Secretariat, of Colombo District, of Western Province, Sri Lanka.

Demographics

Ethnicity

Religion

References 

Grama Niladhari Divisions of Thimbirigasyaya Divisional Secretariat